The 7D is an American animated television series produced by Disney Television Animation, which premiered on Disney XD on July 7, 2014. It is a re-imagining of the title characters from the 1937 film Snow White and the Seven Dwarfs by Walt Disney Animation Studios, and their adventures prior to the introduction of Snow White. The first season consisted of 24 episodes. On December 2, 2014, the series was renewed for a second season. On April 25, 2016, Disney XD announced that the series would be cancelled after two seasons. The show aired its final episode on November 5, 2016. 44 episodes were produced.

Episodes

Characters

The 7D

The 7D are a group of dwarves who protect Jollywood from the Glooms and other threats. They are the descendants of the dwarves that founded Jollywood. The members of the 7D are:
 (voiced by Billy West) – West describes Bashful as a sweet character who tries to catch up to the others. He also likes that Bashful has another side to him.
 (voiced by Bill Farmer) – Doc invents things, including the sky buckets transportation system for all of Jollywood. Farmer has been the voice of Goofy, and also Sleepy in other Snow White and the Seven Dwarfs projects. Farmer said that in making a new take on Doc, he pinches his voice and makes him a little scatterbrained.
 (vocal effects provided by Dee Bradley Baker) – Dopey communicates with whistles, animal sounds, and visual gags. Baker said that portraying Dopey was easier and allows for more freedom because he uses only animal sounds and whistles.
 (voiced by Maurice LaMarche) – In portraying Grumpy, LaMarche drew inspiration from his friend who is a stockbroker, as well as parts of Danny DeVito's character Louie De Palma from Taxi and Jason Alexander's character George Costanza from Seinfeld.
 (voiced by Kevin Michael Richardson) – Richardson said that he drew inspiration from fellow voice actor Jim Cummings with a "country / New Orleans" voice where he is "always upbeat, always positive," and as "if someone just handed him a beer." Ruegger said that Richardson was the first one of the seven to be cast, and that his voice set the tone for casting the others.
 (voiced by Stephen Stanton) – In an interview with Variety, Scott Menville said that Stephen Stanton came up with over fifty different ways to snore.
 (voiced by Scott Menville)

The Glooms

 (voiced by Kelly Osbourne) – Hildy is a witch and Grim's wife. Hildy is Osbourne's first major voiceover role; Osbourne was asked after Disney had auditioned 300 girls. She said that she had not seen the character design, which was created before the auditions, until after she got the job. She describes Hildy as "bad with the best intentions" and calls her "my alter ego – my Sasha Fierce".
 (voiced by Jess Harnell) – Grim is a warlock and Hildy's husband. Harnell describes him as "a bad-at-being-bad guy". Regarding his role as a Disney villain, he said that "there's a fine line — especially in 7D, which is a broad comedy — because you don't want to scare little kids".

Jollywood characters

 (voiced by Leigh-Allyn Baker) – the ditzy ruler of Jollywood.
 (voiced by Paul Rugg) – Queen Delightful's personal assistant. In portraying Starchbottom, Rugg drew inspiration from Jerry Lewis, whom he and Ruegger both admire.

Recurring characters

Magic Mirror (voiced by Whoopi Goldberg) – The Magic Mirror serves Queen Delightful and resides in the castle's treasure room.
Crystal Ball (voiced by Jay Leno) – The Crystal Ball is an artifact the Glooms use to spy on Queen Delightful.
 (voiced by Bill Farmer) – Sir Yipsalot is Queen Delightful's pet dog. His favorite treat is pickles.
 (voiced by Dee Bradley Baker) – Squire Peckington is Queen Delightful's pet parrot who is seen perching in her crown.
 (voiced by Leigh-Allyn Baker) – Snazzy Shazam is a witch who was Hildy Gloom's rival in school.  She frequently competes in the witch contests where Hildy feels like she needs to upstage her.
 – Peaches is a slow-moving warthog who pulls the Glooms' carriage.
 (voiced by Dee Bradley Baker) – Grumpy's pet goat. In "Finders Keepers", Giselle develops a friendly rivalry with Peaches. In the episode "When Pigs Fly", it is revealed that Giselle's last name is Munchen.

Production
The 7D was placed into production in June 2012 for the Disney Junior channel with characters redesigned by Noah Z. Jones (who also made Fish Hooks for Disney before). In an interview with IndieWire, Gimeno said that the pilot episode was done in Flash, but the series was changed to traditional 2D which added production value as Flash was design heavy. The storyboards and pre-production were done at Disney. Animation was produced by Digital eMation in South Korea and Toon City in the Philippines. Ruegger also said that the 2D is also better suited for the show's style.

The theme song and many of the in-episode songs are done by Parry Gripp. He describes the song as "in kind of a punk rock style...It's pretty fast and has guitars and the tone of my voice is a bit nasal and aggressive. But the music in the show really varies." In an interview with Geek Mom, Gripp said that he was asked to pitch song ideas for various Disney shows, and that The 7D clicked with his style. He estimates he wrote about 120 songs for the first season, although many are very short and their styles vary. Composer Keith Horn does the orchestration in the show.

Entertainment journalist Jim Hill has noted that some have related the voice ensemble to Marvel's Avengers since it features actors who have voiced in popular cartoon shows. He also noted how many of the crew have worked on  Animaniacs, including Tom Ruegger, Sherri Stoner, Paul Rugg, Deanna Oliver, and Randy Rogel. Among the voice actors, LaMarche had voiced Brain, and Jess Harnell had voiced Wakko. Voice director Kelly Ward said "God forbid if anything were to happen when they were all in one place because the voice-over industry would be dealt a crippling blow." The cast usually recorded in ensembles of two to four characters when possible, with Ruegger editing the timing afterwards for characters that recorded separately.

Scott Menville, who voices Sneezy, said that the show takes place before Snow White was born so the Evil Queen from the film will not be there. He also said it is a contemporary take on the film as the characters are hip to the current generation and its pop culture references. Jevon Phillips of Hero Complex also placed the series 30 years or so before Snow White. Ruegger said that the show's demographic differed from his previous works with Animaniacs and Pinky and the Brain; however, he was also encouraged by Disney Junior to expand the demographic to include parents.

Broadcast
The 7D debuted on July 7, 2014, on Disney XD, on the Disney Junior block on Disney Channel on December 26, and on the Disney Junior channel in 2015. In Canada, the series began broadcast on July 13 on Disney XD. It premiered on Disney Channel in Southeast Asia on September 7. In Australia, Disney XD began broadcasting the series on December 1.

On December 2, 2014, the series was renewed for a second season, where Ruegger planned to make 39 half-hour episodes. The season premiered on Disney XD on January 23, 2016. The season had guest stars like Ozzy and Sharon Osbourne as Hildy's parents, Fran Drescher, Amy Sedaris, Jim Belushi, Jay Mohr, George Takei and "Weird Al" Yankovic. On April 25, 2016, co-executive producer Mr. Warburton posted on his blog that the second season would be the series' final season and that the crew will be moving on to other projects. The series finale aired on November 5, 2016.

Reception
The 7D premiere broadcast ranked number 2 overall among Disney XD's animated original-series premieres for kids 2–11 and kids 6–11.

Brian Lowry of Variety wrote poorly of the show, claiming that it has none of the charm of the source material, and that its plots "fall into a sort of No Kid's Land in terms of age groups". Rob Owen wrote in the Pittsburgh Post-Gazette that the characters were blandly drawn, and that the show was just a chance to capitalize on the film.

The 7D won Outstanding Original Song at the 44th Daytime Creative Arts Emmy Awards. At the Golden Reel Awards 2014, the episodes "Buckets / Frankengloom" received a nomination for Outstanding Achievement in Sound Editing – Sound Effects, Foley, Music, Dialogue and ADR for Short Form Animation Broadcast Media.

Video games
In June 2014, Disney Publishing Worldwide released "The 7D Mine Train", an endless-runner video game where the player chooses one of the redesigned 7D dwarfs as their game avatar to pilot a mine car through various levels of the mine, picking up gems. It is loosely associated with the Seven Dwarfs Mine Train attraction at Walt Disney World which opened in May 2014.

Disney also released an online game on their Disney XD website called "The 7D Dwarf Track Builder" where players can assemble a mine track or sky bucket course according to the dwarfs' specifications.

References

External links

 
 
 

2010s American animated television series
2014 American television series debuts
2016 American television series endings
2010s American musical comedy television series
American children's animated adventure television series
American children's animated comedy television series
American children's animated fantasy television series
American children's animated musical television series
American prequel television series
Disney XD original programming
Snow White (franchise)
English-language television shows
Television series based on Disney films
Television series based on adaptations
Television shows based on fairy tales
Television series by Disney Television Animation
Television series set in fictional countries
Witchcraft in television
Yeti in fiction
Sandman in television
Works based on Snow White
Seven Dwarfs